Anita M. Elvidge (1895 — 16 March 1981) was an American artist and former First Lady of Guam.

Early life 
Elvidge was born in Oakland, California, in 1895.

Education 
Elvidge attended California College of Arts and Crafts and later the University of Washington in Seattle, Washington.

Career 
Elvidge was an artist. In 1952, Elvidge's art works of Landscapes in Watercolor works on display in the Frye Museum in Washington. Elvidge's art works were also on display in the Seattle Art Museum.

In 1956, when Ford Quint Elvidge was appointed by President Dwight D. Eisenhower as the Governor of Guam, Elvidge became the First Lady of Guam on April 23, 1953, until May 19, 1956. In Guam, Elvidge was in charge of the Governor's House, where she resided with her husband, a Guamanian servant, and a Chinese cook.

In 1972, Elvidge wrote Guam Interlude, a book about her experience in Guam.

Works 
 Stranded. A reproduction of a painting in watercolor.
 Thanksgiving Sale, Pacific Coast China Co. Tempera on paper.

Personal life 
Elvidge's husband was Ford Quint Elvidge, an American attorney and former Governor of Guam. They have three children, Marthanna, Robert, and Carolyn. Elvidge and her family lived in Seattle, Washington and Guam.

Elvidge's daughter Marthanna Elvidge Veblen (1920-2015) became a librarian and an author in Washington.

Elvidge's son Robert Fred Elvidge (1925-2019) became a businessman in Washington. He was an owner and operator of business in bookkeeping, tax preparation, carpet cleaning, and janitorial services in Washington.

On March 16, 1981, Elvidge died in Seattle, Washington.

References

External links 
 Anita M. Elvidge at womenpainters.com
 Oral Histories - Elvidge, Ford Q. and Anita M. (OH-369)
 Reminiscences of Ford Q. and Anita M. Elvidge, 1976 at columbia.edu
 Women Painters of Washington. 1948 Block Print Calendar
 Anita Miller Elvidge at askart.com

American artists
Guamanian women in politics
First Ladies and Gentlemen of Guam
Washington (state) Republicans